The non-marine mollusks of the Philippines are a part of the molluscan fauna of the Philippines (the wildlife of the Philippines). A number of species of non-marine mollusks are found in the wild in the Philippines.

Freshwater gastropods 

Pomatiopsidae
 Oncomelania hupensis Gredler, 1881

Land gastropods 

Alycaeidae
 Chamalycaeus excisus excisus (Möllendorff, 1887)
 Chamalycaeus excisus sublimus Páll-Gergely & Auffenberg, 2019
 Chamalycaeus rarus Páll-Gergely & Auffenberg, 2019
 Metalycaeus quadrasi (Möllendorff, 1895)
 Metalycaeus cyphogyrus (Quadras & Möllendorff,1895)
 Metalycaeus caroli (Semper, 1862)
 Metalycaeus semperi Páll-Gergely & Auffenberg, 2019
 Metalycaeus tomotrema (Möllendorff,1887)

Diplommatinidae
 Diplommatina cagayanica Möllendorff, 1893
 Diplommatina (Sinica) concolor Quadras & Möllendorff, 1893
 Diplommatina (Sinica) filicostata Möllendorff, 1893
 Diplommatina latilabris Kobelt, 1886
 Luzonocoptis angulata Páll-Gergely & Hunyadi, 2017
 Luzonocoptis antenna Páll-Gergely & Hunyadi, 2017
 Palaina conspicua Möllendorff, 1893
 Palaina conspicua versicolor Möllendorff, 1893
 Palaina cristata Quadras & Möllendorff, 1893

Diapheridae
 Diaphera cumingiana (Pfeiffer, 1845)

Hypselostomatidae
 Aulacospira hololoma (Möllendorf, 1887)
 Aulacospira krobyloides Páll-Gergely & Schilthuizen, 2019
 Aulacospira lens Páll-Gergely & Auffenberg, 2019
 Aulacospira mucronata (Möllendorf, 1887)
 Aulacospira porrecta Quadras & Möllendorf, 1894
 Aulacospira rhombostoma Quadras & Möllendorf, 1896
 Aulacospira scalatella (Möllendorf, 1888)
 Aulacospira triptycha Quadras & Möllendorf, 1895
 Pseudostreptaxis azpeitiae (Hidalgo, 1890)
 Pseudostreptaxis harli Páll-Gergely & Schilthuizen, 2019

See also
Lists of molluscs of surrounding countries:
 List of non-marine molluscs of Taiwan
 List of non-marine molluscs of China
 List of non-marine molluscs of Hong Kong
 List of non-marine molluscs of Malaysia
 List of non-marine molluscs of Vietnam

References

 01
Molluscs
Philippines
Philippines